East Warburton is a town in Victoria, Australia, 67 km east from Melbourne's central business district, located within the Shire of Yarra Ranges local government area.

The Post Office opened on 1 November 1921 and closed in 1975.

References

External links
The Official website Visit Warburton - Warburton Valley Community and  Economic Development Association (CEDA)

Towns in Victoria (Australia)
Yarra Valley
Yarra Ranges